The Eclipse Award for Outstanding Apprentice Jockey is an American thoroughbred horse racing honor. Created in 1971, it is part of the Eclipse Awards program honoring Champions in numerous horse racing categories.  This article lists the annual winners of the Eclipse Award for a jockey undergoing their apprenticeship.

The 1977 winner, Steve Cauthen, also won the overall Eclipse Award for Outstanding Jockey that same year.  Three women have won this Eclipse Award: Rosemary Homeister in 1992, Emma-Jayne Wilson in 2005, and Jessica Pyfer for 2021. 

Past winners: 
1971 : Gene St. Leon
1972 : Thomas Wallis
1973 : Steve Valdez
1974 : Chris McCarron
1975 : Jimmy Edwards
1976 : George Martens
1977 : Steve Cauthen
1978 : Ron Franklin
1979 : Cash Asmussen
1980 : Frank Lovato Jr.
1981 : Richard Migliore
1982 : Alberto Delgado
1983 : Declan Murphy
1984 : Wesley Ward
1985 : Art Madrid Jr.
1986 : Allen Stacy
1987 : Kent Desormeaux
1988 : Steve Capanas
1989 : Michael J. Luzzi
1990 : Mark T. Johnston
1991 : Mickey Walls
1992 : Rosemary Homeister
1993 : Juan Umana
1994 : Dale Beckner
1995 : Ramon B. Perez

1996 : Neil Poznansky
1997 : Roberto Rosado & Philip Teator (tie)
1998 : Shaun Bridgmohan
1999 : Ariel Smith
2000 : Tyler Baze
2001 : Jeremy Rose
2002 : Ryan Fogelsonger
2003 : Eddie Castro
2004 : Brian Hernandez Jr.
2005 : Emma-Jayne Wilson
2006 : Julien Leparoux
2007 : Joe Talamo
2008 : Pascacio "Paco" Lopez
2009 : Christian Santiago Reyes
2010 : Omar Moreno
2011 : Kyle Frey
2012 : Jose Montano
2013 : Victor Carrasco
2014 : Drayden Van Dyke
2015 : Tyler Gaffalione
2016 : Luis Ocasio
2017 : Evin A. Roman
2018 : Weston Hamilton
2019 : Kazushi Kimura
2020 : Alexander Crispin
2021 : Jessica Pyfer
2022 : Jose Antonio Gomez

References
 The Eclipse Awards at the Thoroughbred Racing Associations of America, Inc.
 The Bloodhorse.com Champion's history charts

 
Horse racing awards
Horse racing in the United States